The St. Jones River is a river flowing to Delaware Bay in central Delaware in the United States.

History
The river is believed to have been named either for Robert Jones, an early European property owner in the region, or for "St. Jone", the Welsh spelling of St. John.

Course
The St. Jones River flows for its entire length in east-central Kent County. According to the Geographic Names Information System, the river begins at the dam of Silver Lake in the city of Dover; Silver Lake is fed by Fork Branch, Penrose Branch, and Maidstone Branch.

Watershed
The lower course of the river southeast of Dover is surrounded by brackish marshes and salt marshes, open water habitats, and wetlands. A portion of the lower river, along with nearby Blackbird Creek, have received federal protection as the Delaware National Estuarine Research Reserve, part of the National Estuarine Research Reserve system.

Variant names
The United States Board on Geographic Names settled on "St. Jones River" as the stream's name in 1894.  According to the Geographic Names Information System, it has also been known historically as:
Jones Creek 
Joness Creek 
Kishlen 
Saint Jones Creek 
Warge Kijhlen 
Wulfs Creek 
Wulfscreek

See also
List of Delaware rivers

References

External links

St. Jones River Trail

Dover, Delaware
Rivers of Delaware
Rivers of Kent County, Delaware
Tributaries of Delaware Bay